The 1993 Pro Bowl was the NFL's all-star game for the 1992 season. The game was played on February 7, 1993, at Aloha Stadium in Honolulu, Hawaii. The final score was AFC — 23, NFC — 20. Steve Tasker of the Buffalo Bills was the game's MVP. This was the first Pro Bowl to go into overtime. All four starting linebackers of the New Orleans Saints, who were collectively nicknamed the Dome Patrol, were part of the NFC squad. The Dome Patrol consisted of Rickey Jackson, Sam Mills, Vaughan Johnson, and Pat Swilling. The game's referee was Howard Roe.

Game summary
Nick Lowery's 33-yard field goal 4:09 into the extra period gave the AFC a 23–20 victory in the annual pro football all star game.  The AFC won despite being dominated by the NFC in first downs 30–9, and in total yards gained 471–114.  The AFC was able to capitalize on 6 forced turnovers, two blocked field goals (one of which was returned for a touchdown), and an interception that was taken back for six points.  Special teams ace Steve Tasker of the AFC Champion Buffalo Bills was named the player of the game for making four tackles, forcing a fumble and blocking a field goal.  His block came at a crucial point with just 8 minutes left and the game tied at 13. Los Angeles Raiders Terry McDaniel scooped up the ball and raced 28 yards to give the AFC a 20–13 lead.  The NFC however rallied behind San Francisco 49ers quarterback Steve Young, whose fourth down 23-yard touchdown pass to New York Giants running back Rodney Hampton tied the game with just 10 seconds left.  Steve Young was 18 of 32 passes for 196 yards but was also sacked 3 times and lost a fumble in overtime. Howie Long of the Raiders fell on the ball setting up the game-winning field goal.

Halftime entertainment was provided by Randy Travis as he sang his song Heroes and Friends.

Scoring summary
AFC 0       10 3        7 3       23

NFC 3       10 0        7 0       20

NFC 1st: FG Morten Andersen 27 yards 3–0 NFC

AFC 2nd: Junior Seau 31 Int Return (Nick Lowery Kick)  7–3 AFC

NFC 2nd: FG Morten Andersen 37 yards 6–7 AFC

NFC 2nd: Michael Irvin 9 pass from Troy Aikman (Morten Andersen Kick) 13–7 NFC

AFC 2nd: FG Nick Lowery 42 yards 13–10 NFC

AFC 3rd: FG Nick Lowery 29 yards 13–13

AFC 4th: Terry McDaniel 28-yard blocked FG return (Nick Lowery Kick) 20–13 AFC

NFC 4th: Rodney Hampton 23 pass from Steve Young (Morten Andersen Kick) 20–20

AFC OT: Nick Lowery 33 FG 23–20 AFC

AFC roster

Offense

Defense

Special teams

NFC roster

Offense

Defense

Special teams

References

External links

Pro Bowl
Pro Bowl
Pro Bowl
Pro Bowl
Pro Bowl
American football competitions in Honolulu
February 1993 sports events in the United States
February 1993 sports events in Oceania